Bill Cronin may refer to:

 Bill Cronin (baseball) (1902–1966), American baseball player and manager
 Bill Cronin (American football coach), American football coach
 Bill Cronin (fullback) (1901–1956), American football player
 Bill Cronin (tight end) (1943–1991), American football player